The 2013 America East Conference baseball tournament was held from May 22 through 26.  The top four regular season finishers of the league's six teams met in the double-elimination tournament held at Edward A. LeLacheur Park in Lowell, Massachusetts.  This is the first year that the event was held at a pre-determined neutral site since 2001.  UMass Lowell, which would join the conference following the season and was a tenant of the park, served as the host of the tournament.  Second-seeded Binghamton defeated first-seeded Maine in the championship game, which was played at Rhode Island's Bill Beck Field due to scheduling issues.

Seeding and format
The top four finishers from the regular season were seeded one through four based on conference winning percentage only.  The teams played a double-elimination tournament.

Bracket

All-Tournament Team

Most Outstanding Player
Jake Lambert, Binghamton

References

America East Conference Baseball Tournament
Tournament
American East Conference baseball tournament
America East Conference baseball tournament
Baseball competitions in Lowell, Massachusetts
College baseball tournaments in Massachusetts